The Mainz tramway network is a network of tramways forming part of the public transport system in Mainz, the capital city of the  federal state of Rhineland-Palatinate, Germany.

Lines 
, the Mainz tramway network has the following five lines:

Since Autumn 2016, the "Mainzelbahn" has been transporting passengers from Hauptbahnhof West (main station, west entrance) via University and Marienborn to Lerchenberg, and offers a fast connection between the main station and the University as well as the headquarters of ZDF ("Zweites Deutsches Fernsehen", a public television channel in Germany) in the district of Lerchenberg. Further, a new line is planned. The "Zollhafen Tram" links the new Zollhafen residential area with the tram network. To operate the new lines, the MVG ordered 10 Variotrams from Stadler Rail.

Rolling stock

See also
List of town tramway systems in Germany
Trams in Germany

References

External links

 
 

Mainz
Transport in Mainz
Metre gauge railways in Germany
600 V DC railway electrification
Mainz